Strawberry Moon may refer to:
 Strawberry Moon, a full moon phenomenon 
 Strawberry Moon (album), a 1987 album by Grover Washington Jr.
 "Strawberry Moon" (song), a 2021 song by IU
 "Strawberry Moon", a 2021 song by Twice from Kura Kura

See also 
 Full moon
 Strawberry Supermoon - Strawberry moon that is also a Supermoon